Ramal Ali oglu Aslanov (nicknamed Lord; Chanlibel, Shamkir) is an Azerbaijani professional kickboxer. He holds the world kickboxing belt. He has won the Azerbaijani championship 11 times, and the World and European championship 3 times. Aslanov has received the title of "Honored Master of Sports" in Azerbaijan. He is the vice-president and captain of the Azerbaijan Kickboxing Federation.

Early life 
Ramal Aslanov was born on 1 March 1992, in Chanlibel, Shamkir District.  He is originally from the Gegharkunik region of today's Armenia. Aslanov has a sister. He wanted to be a doctor in high school, but then stopped focusing on his school life as he won kickboxing championships. Aslanov graduated from high school in 2009 and the Azerbaijan State Physical Culture and Sports Academy in 2014. He served in the sports team of the Internal Troops of the Azerbaijani Ministry of Internal Affairs from 2014 to 2015.

Career

Kickboxing 
Ramal Aslanov trained in Muay Thai for only a week in 2004, and in the same year began training in kickboxing. His first and last coach is Hakim Hajiyev, who has received the title of "honored coach" in Azerbaijan. Aslanov is a six-time champion of Azerbaijan in amateur kickboxing. He won the Azerbaijani championship 11 times, and the World and European championship 3 times. Among professionals, he has a world belt in IKBO, WAC, WMAO, FF, and WCF.

In March 2015, Aslanov won first place at the World Kickboxing Championship in Portugal. He became a world champion in 2012, forcing his opponent to surrender in the third round of the World Kickboxing Championship among professionals in Düsseldorf, Germany, and brought the world belt to Azerbaijan. Aslanov holds the Azerbaijani belt in 71 and 86 kg among professionals. He became the World Champion on March 26, 2016, in Koblenz, Germany, defeating Dutch athlete Mervin Rozenstruik in WMAO (K-1). Aslanov defeated the Lithuanian athlete in the final in 2016 and became the winner of the World Grand Prix tournament for the first time in the history of Azerbaijan. He took a part in the super-final of The World Faith Fight series in Beijing, China that year, defeating Lee Yinggang from China. He won the Grand Prix in 2018 for the second time. Aslanov became the world champion in October 2019, defeating Miloš Keljanović from Serbia (-75 kg) in the final of the World Kickboxing Championship held in Sarajevo, Bosnia and Herzegovina. As of July 2021, Aslanov had 37 wins (13 of which were by knockout) from 42 official matches during his professional career.

Aslanov has been the captain of the national team of the Azerbaijan Kickboxing Federation since 2014. In July 2021, he was appointed vice-president of the Azerbaijan Kickboxing Federation. Aslanov was also appointed Deputy Chairman of the Board of the Federation.

Boxing 
Aslanov won a silver medal in December 2018 on behalf of Sadarak Sports Club, making his debut in the Azerbaijani boxing championship in the weight category of 75 kg. He competed in five matches in the championship and won three of them by knockout.

Awards 
Ramal Aslanov was named the best kickboxer of the year by the Azerbaijani Ministry of Youth and Sports in 2012 and 2019. He was awarded an honorary degree by the President of Azerbaijan Ilham Aliyev in 2016. In 2015, he was awarded the honorary title of "Master of Sports", and in 2017 he was awarded the honorary title of "Honored Master of Sports". In 2018, President Ilham Aliyev presented Aslanov with a new apartment.

References

External links 
 
 

Azerbaijani male kickboxers
People from Shamkir District
Living people
1992 births